Johan Theodorus (Jan) Broekhuijse (Haarzuilens, the Netherlands, 22 December 1929 – Nieuwkoop, the Netherlands, 27 September 2020) was a Dutch anthropologist, ethnographer, civil servant and photographer.<ref>{{cite web |url=https://hdl.handle.net/20.500.11840/pi900 |title='Dr. J.T. (Johan Theodorus) Broekhuijse |last= |first= |date= |website= |language=Dutch |publisher=Nationaal Museum van Wereldculturen |access-date=22 April 2022 |quote=}}</ref>

 Career 
Broekhuijse, the son of a farmer from Haarzuilens in the center of the Netherlands, studied Non-Western Sociology at Utrecht University where he graduated cum laude in 1958. In January 1959 he left for Dutch New Guinea to become a civil servant of the Dutch government there. Broekhuijse was researching the living conditions of the urbanized Papuans in Hollandia, when he was transferred that same year to post Wamena in the eastern highlands, where the Dutch government still lacked a firm foothold. As a staff member of the Kantoor Bevolkingszaken (Population Affairs Office), a government office promoting anthropological, linguistic and demographic research among the Papuans, he researched the culture of the Dani people in the Baliem Valley, a warlike mountain tribe that had not yet been brought under Dutch control. In those years, Broekhuijse was also an advisor and participant of the American Harvard-Peabody Expedition (1961–1965) to the Dani, led by the cinematographer and anthropologist Robert Gardner. The expedition resulted in Gardner's prize winning documentary film Dead birds (1963), on the warfare of the Dani people. However, expedition member and sound engineer Michael C. Rockefeller, son of the politician Nelson Rockefeller, disappeared without a trace in November 1961.

After returning to the Netherlands in 1964, Broekhuijse served for several years as a civil servant at the Dutch Ministry of Foreign Affairs while he prepared his Dutch PhD thesis for his doctorate in 1967 with professor Henri Théodore Fischer (1901–1976) at Utrecht University. The same year he joined the Anthropology Department of the Royal Tropical Institute (Koninklijk Instituut voor de Tropen, KIT) in Amsterdam as a scientific officer, with Jan van Baal (1909–1992), Dutch anthropologist and former governor of New Guinea, at the helm since 1959. Until his retirement in 1994 Broekhuijse was affiliated with KIT, where he mainly conducted research in Africa for development projects. In the early 1970s he joined a acquisition tour in Burkina Faso for the Tropenmuseum (Museum of the Tropics), resulting in hundreds of ethnographic photographs.

Broekhuijse later donated his extensive collection of ethnographic objects from the Dani and the Lani people of Western New Guinea to the Tropenmuseum at Amsterdam and passed away in 2020 at the age of 90.

Gallery: Samo culture of Burkina Faso, 1970–1971
Photographs by Jan Broekhuijse:

Publications
His publications include
 De Papoea migrant in Hollandia : (urbanisation of Hollandia), Amsterdam : Afdeling Culturele en Physische Anthropologie van het Koninklijk Instituut voor de Tropen, around 1960
 De Wiligiman-Dani: een cultureel-anthropologische studie over religie en oorlogvoering in de Baliem-vallei. Dutch PhD Dissertation. Utrecht, 1967. Tilburg: Gianotten.
 with Marin Terrible and Edgar Bafo: Désertification et auto-suffisance alimentaire : une vue de la base, Oegstgeest etc.: Cebemo, 1985. (On Burkina Faso.)The organization of rural society in the Sahel. KIT Bulletin 314a. Amsterdam: Koninklijk Instituut voor de Tropen, 1989.
 with Alioune Sall, L'organisation du monde rural Sahélien, Amsterdam : Institut Royal des Tropiques, Programme de Développement Rural, cop. 1989. Bulletin 314.
 De Harvard-Peabody-expeditie in de Baliemvallei, in: P. Schoorl (Ed.), Besturen in Nederlands-Nieuw-Guinea 1945–1962. Leiden: KITLV Uitgeverij, 1996, pp. 128–148.
 Monografie van de Mossi: noordelijk plateau – Sanmatenga, Burkina Faso. Amsterdam: Koninklijk Instituut voor de Tropen, 1998.Memorie van overgave: een wijsgerig-antropologisch onderzoek naar de mentale structuren die het menselijk leven aansturen en ordenen in religie en cultuur. Noorden: Uitgeverij Bert Post, 2009.
 De Harvard-Peabody Expeditie. Naar de Dani van de Baliem-vallei: ethnografische en autobiografische notities, exploratieressort oostelijk bergland, Nieuw-Guinea''. Self-published, 2020. ISBN 978-1616272654.

Archives
 . On Broekhuijse's work as a civil servant in Hollandia, the Baliem valley and the Schouten Islands, 1937–1966.
 
  Photographic collection of Broekhuijse kept at this museum.

References 

1929 births
2020 deaths
Dutch anthropologists
20th-century Dutch scientists
People from Utrecht (province)
Utrecht University alumni
Dutch ethnographers
20th-century social scientists